With the East Wind is a 1966 Spanish drama film directed by Mario Camus. It was entered into the 1966 Cannes Film Festival.

Cast
 Antonio Gades as Sebastián
 Vicente Escudero as Montoya
 María José Alfonso as Lupe
 Manuel Arbó as El Pesqui
 Francisco Arenzana as Sargento
 Imperio Argentina as La madre
 Mari Paz Ballesteros as Sebastian's Sister
 Chiro Bermejo as El barbero
 José Caride as Larios
 Antonio Ferrandis as tío Manuel
 Rufino Inglés as El alcalde
 Juan Lizárraga as Un cliente de la taberna
 Ángel Lombarte as Maño, el tabernero
 Luis Marín as Manolo, el barman
 José Manuel Martín as Zafra
 Felipe Martín Puertas as Un cliente de la taberna
 Miguel Palenzuela as Marquise
 Erasmo Pascual as Cabeda
 María Luisa Ponte as Carola
 Fernando Sánchez Polack as Francisco Vázquez
 José Sepúlveda as Don Baldomero
 Lluís Torner as El Lango

References

External links

1966 films
1960s Spanish-language films
1966 drama films
Films directed by Mario Camus
Spanish drama films
1960s Spanish films